Adrian Jose Del Castillo (born September 27, 1999) is an American professional baseball catcher in the Arizona Diamondbacks organization.

Amateur career
Del Castillo attended Gulliver Preparatory School in Miami, Florida, where he played baseball. As a senior in 2018, he hit .527 with 15 home runs and 35 RBIs. He was selected by the Chicago White Sox in the 36th round of the 2018 Major League Baseball draft, but did not sign and instead enrolled at the University of Miami.

In 2019, Del Castillo's freshman season, he started 61 games and hit .331/.418/.576 with 12 home runs and 72 RBIs. He spent a majority of his time in right field but also spent time at catcher, third base, and designated hitter. He was named to the All-Atlantic Coast Conference Freshman Team and Second Team alongside earning Freshman-All American honors from various outlets. That summer, he played in the Cape Cod Baseball League for the Wareham Gatemen. For his sophomore season in 2020, Del Castillo was expected to shift primarily to catching. He hit .358 with two home runs and 15 RBIs over 16 starts before the college baseball season was cut short due to the COVID-19 pandemic. For the 2021 season, Del Castillo appeared in 54 games in which he batted .275 with three home runs and 37 RBIs.

Professional career
Del Castillo was selected by the Arizona Diamondbacks in the second round with the 67th overall selection of the 2021 Major League Baseball draft. He signed with the club for a $1 million signing bonus. To begin his professional career, he was assigned to the Rookie-level Arizona Complex League Diamondbacks before being promoted to the Visalia Rawhide of the Low-A West after two games. Over 24 games for the 2021 season, Del Castillo slashed .265/.367/.422 with one home run, 14 RBIs, and six doubles.

Del Castillo was assigned to the Hillsboro Hops of the High-A Northwest League to begin the 2022 season, but also played briefly with the Arizona Complex League Diamondbacks and Visalia. Over 86 games between the three teams, he batted .210 with seven home runs and 31 RBIs.

References

External links

Miami Hurricanes bio

1999 births
Living people
Baseball players from Miami
Baseball catchers
Miami Hurricanes baseball players
Wareham Gatemen players
Arizona Complex League Diamondbacks players
Visalia Rawhide players